Hugo Gomes may refer to:

 Hugo Gomes (footballer, born 1979), Portuguese football right-back
 Hugo Gomes (footballer, born 1995), Brazilian football centre-back

See also
 Hugo Gómez (born 1948), Colombian actor